Leck Hall is an 18th-century country house located at Leck, Lancashire, England, near Kirkby Lonsdale.

The hall is grade II listed. and stands in an informal park with an orangery nearby. Home farm, late 18th century, is close to the house and there is a Lodge at the entrance to the drive.

It is the current seat of Baron Shuttleworth, of Gawthorpe Hall, Padiham in the County Palatine of Lancaster (Lancashire) and is not open to the public.

History 
Robert Welch, a Liverpool merchant who lived at High House, Leck, bought the Thurland Castle estate in 1771, but his son Robert sold all of the land but the part which is now the Leck estate. On Robert's death his brother George had architect John Carr design and build a new house to replace High House, which was afterwards called Leck Hall. It was altered in 1830 and again in 1963.

The estate was purchased in 1952 by Charles Kay-Shuttleworth, 4th Baron Shuttleworth who moved there from Gawthorpe Hall in 1970. The current owner is his son Charles Kay-Shuttleworth, 5th Baron Shuttleworth.

See also

Listed buildings in Leck, Lancashire

References

Country houses in Lancashire
Grade II listed buildings in Lancashire
Buildings and structures in the City of Lancaster